Cyril Hazard is a British astronomer. He is known for revolutionising quasar observation with John Bolton in 1962. His work allowed other astronomers to find redshifts from the emission lines from other radio sources.

Early work
Cyri Hasard was born on 18th March 1928 in No.6, Flosh Cottages, Cleator, Cumberland. 
Cyril Hazard grew up in Cleator Moor, Cumberland.. He got his doctorate from the University of Manchester, studying under Sir Bernard Lovell. He worked first at Jodrell Bank.

The discovery
Two radio sources were involved 3C 48 and 3C 273
Measurements taken by Cyril Hazard and John Bolton during one of the occultations using the Parkes Radio Telescope allowed Maarten Schmidt to optically identify the object and obtain an optical spectrum using the 200-inch Hale Telescope on Mount Palomar. This spectrum revealed the same strange emission lines. Schmidt realized that these were actually spectral lines of hydrogen redshifted at the rate of 15.8 percent. This discovery showed that 3C 273 was receding at a rate of 47,000 km/s.

The technique
As the source is occulting behind the moon ( viz. passing behind), Fresnel style diffraction patterns are produced which can be detected by very large radio telescopes and the exact locations calculated.

Memory
The minor planet 9305 Hazard, discovered on 7 October 1986 by Edward "Ted" Bowell, was named after him.

References

Bibliography
Hazard, C.; Mackey, M. B.; and Shimmeris, A. J. "Investigation of the radio Source 3C273 by the Method of Lunar Occultation." Nature 197, 1037, 1963.

20th-century British astronomers